Adirondack League Club vs. Sierra Club was a court case decided on December 17, 1998, by New York's highest court, the New York Court of Appeals, denying the defendants' motions for summary judgment that the South Branch of the Moose River flowing through Adirondack League Club property was a public highway, but holding that recreational use can be considered in determining if a river is a public highway. The case was sent back to the trial court for additional review. However, the case was settled before there was a final court determination as to whether the river was a public highway. The settlement, which can be found under Appendix 12 of the Moose River Plains Wild Forest Unit Management Plan, allows the public to use the river at certain times of the year and under certain conditions.

Although Adirondack League Club vs. Sierra Club established that recreational use can be considered in determining whether a river is a public highway, in Friends of Thayer Lake, LLC v. Brown, the New York Court of Appeals declined to answer whether the capacity for recreational use alone is sufficient to prove that a river is a public highway, and sent the case back to the trial court for consideration of "the Waterway's historical and prospective commercial utility, the Waterway's historical accessibility to the public, the relative ease of passage by canoe, the volume of historical travel, and the volume of prospective commercial and recreational use." The trial court ruled in favor of the landowners, and the decision was not appealed.

"Navigable-in-fact" 
 
Rivers were once important means of transporting commodities such as logs to market, and in the nineteenth century, the New York legislature declared numerous rivers public highways using their power of eminent domain. In contrast to rivers declared public highways by statute, the term "navigable-in-fact" generally refers to rivers of such importance that they are considered public highways under the common law. The Court of Appeals states that "This rule is longstanding and recognizes that some waterways are of such practical utility that private ownership from the time of the original grant from the State or sovereign is subject to an easement for public travel (see, id., at 458)."

Every state has its own definition of navigable-in-fact, and the federal government has multiple definitions of "navigable" that are applied depending on the circumstance, such as the extent of regulations, admiralty jurisdiction, or title.

New York's definition of "navigable-in-fact" was established by the 1866 Morgan v. King case, which involved the 23 miles of the Raquette River between Colton, New York and Raymondville, at an average width of 18 rods (297 feet). The legislature had attempted to declare the river a public highway by eminent domain in 1850, but had not provided appropriate compensation to affected riparian owners. A watermill owned by the defendant King detained plaintiff Morgan's logs in 1854. Morgan claimed the river was a public highway and therefore King should pay him for his logs. The Court of Appeals needed to determine whether the river was a public highway. In Morgan v. King, the Court of Appeals provided the original definition for what would be considered a public highway in New York:

However, the Court of Appeals ruled regarding the nearly 300-foot wide, 23-mile section of the Raquette River "It would be going beyond the warrant of either principle or precedent to hold that a floatable capacity, so temporary, precarious and unprofitable, constituted the stream a public highway" and that the legislature recognized that the river was private "property that could not be taken for public use without compensation."

Like the federal courts, New York courts also use "navigability" definitions in cases pertaining to issues other than property rights, such as taxation and regulation. While the U.S. Supreme Court established for federal courts that "any reliance upon judicial precedent must be predicated upon careful appraisal of the purpose for which the concept of `navigability' was invoked in a particular case," a nuanced approach most recently applied by the U.S. Supreme Court in PPL Montana, New York courts have yet to make a similar distinction. Navigability precedents from taxation and regulation cases were cited in the Adirondack League Club vs. Sierra Club property rights case.

Before Adirondack League Club v. Sierra Club, New York statutory and case law had virtually no mention of recreational use in definitions of navigable-in-fact. The Adirondack League Club v. Sierra Club case was to decide whether recreational boating can be considered when determining whether or not a river was a public highway. The Court of Appeals summarized the disagreement between the parties about whether recreational use should be considered:

Case 
The Sierra Club Atlantic Chapter was seeking a test case to use common law to open waterways that had been considered private property. They explored a number of rivers, including the Middle Branch of the St. Regis River, and the Beaver River between Lake Lila and Stillwater Reservoir. They settled on the South Branch of the Moose River running through the Adirondack League Club, which not only could be canoed and kayaked, but "was heavily used over the course of at least 50 years for floating logs to market." On June 15, 1991, five boaters in two canoes and one kayak embarked on a trip going down stream on the South Branch of the Moose River in New York. For the boaters to successfully complete their journey, they were forced by obstacles to make several stops to carry their boats over Adirondack League Club land.

Once the trip was completed the Adirondack League Club sued the boaters and the Sierra Club for trespass. The Adirondack League Club claimed the portion of the South Branch in question was private property and recreation was not part of the navigability-in-fact law already in place from Morgan v. King and should not be considered. The boaters argued that the South Branch of the Moose River was a public highway, and modern recreational use should be considered, in addition to historical commercial use.

Decision 
The New York Court of Appeals held that recreational use could be considered in determining whether a river was navigable-in-fact, but that factual questions remained that prevented them from deciding whether the South Branch of the Moose River was a public highway, and denied defendants' motion for summary judgement. The majority stated:

The majority felt that the evidence regarding the historical log driving and modern recreational use were inconclusive. They wrote that  "we are unable to conclude, as a matter of law, that the historical log drives on the South Branch were not accomplished by use of dams and other artificial augmentation of the river flow" and that "the evidence of recreational use does not compel the conclusion that substantially unobstructed travel on the South Branch can occur periodically or seasonally."

The case was sent back to the trial court, where it was settled in 2000, allowing public access to the river at certain times of the year and under certain conditions. However, there was never a final court determination as to whether the South Branch of the Moose River was a public highway.

Cases using ALC v. SC as precedent 

 Friends of Thayer Lake LLC v. Brown, 2016 NY Slip Op 3647 - NY: Court of Appeals 2016
 Mohawk Valley Ski Club, Inc. v. Town of Duanesburg, 304 A.D.2d 881 (2003)
 Dale v. Chisholm, 67 A.D.3d 626 (2009)
 LeBlanc v. Cleveland, 198 F.3d 353 (2d Cir. 1999)

References

1998 in United States case law
New York (state) state case law
Sierra Club litigation
United States land use case law
Adirondacks